The 2001 Bryant Bulldogs football team represented Bryant College as a member of Northeast-10 Conference (NE-10) during the 2001 NCAA Division II football season. The Bulldogs were led by  third-year head coach Jim Miceli and played their home games at Bulldog Stadium. They finished the season 4–5 overall and 4–5 in NE-10 play.

Schedule

References

Bryant
Bryant Bulldogs football seasons
Bryant Bulldogs football